Moncks Cave is a cave located in Redcliffs, Christchurch. It is notable for the amount of wooden artefacts discovered there in 1889 by workmen while quarrying for road metal.

History
The cave was discovered in 1889 by workmen who were quarrying for road metal, as had been done for several years prior. The workmen cleared and dug through the base of the hill, which led to the discovery of the entrance to the cave. Large amounts of cockle shells were discovered when the cave was opened. The cave was most likely closed by a landslide that occurred before European settlement. The cave showed evidence of previous fires by the amount of charcoal found on the roof.

Artefacts
One artefact found in the cave is a wooden ama, which is also known as an outrigger canoe. It was found in 1889, in the same year as the cave's discovery. Other artefacts discovered include a carved paddle, a canoe bailer, a wooden carving of a dog, fragments of a fishing net, a number of greenstone axe, an amount of black hair and bones of fish and moa, which were found in another cave inside the main one. These artefacts have helped researchers learn about Māori culture. Due to the many artefacts found in the cave, it is considered to be one of the greatest archeological finds in New Zealand.

References

Caves of New Zealand
Geography of Christchurch
Heritage New Zealand Category 1 historic places in Canterbury, New Zealand